La Verendrye is a provincial electoral division in the Canadian province of Manitoba.  It was created by redistribution in 1879, and has existed since that time.

La Verendrye is located southeastern region of Manitoba.  Within Manitoba it is bordered by neighbouring electoral divisions Lac du Bonnet, Dawson Trail, Steinbach, Springfield-Ritchot, Midland, Borderland, and to the east by the province of Ontario.

Communities in the riding include Buffalo Point, Gardenton, Grunthal, Kleefeld, New Bothwell, Piney, Middlebro, Otterburne, St Malo, St Pierre, Sarto, Sprague, Stuartburn, Sundown, Vassar, Woodridge and Vita. The Sandilands Provincial Forest is also in the riding.

The riding's population in 1996 was 19,558. In 1999, the average family income was $49,308, and the unemployment rate was 5.9%. Manufacturing accounts for 12% of the riding's industry, followed by the service sector at 11%.

Before the electoral boundaries redistricting done prior to the 2011 election, La Verendrye had the second-highest francophone population in Manitoba (after St. Boniface), at 23% of the total population. 9% of the riding's residents were German, and 7% were aboriginal.

La Verendrye was a hotly contested riding between the Liberals and Conservatives in its earliest years. After 1922, it became dominated by the Progressives, who later became the Liberal-Progressives before metamorphosising into the Liberals again. It remained with the Liberals even as the party dwindled to third-party status in the 1960s. The Progressive Conservative Party of Manitoba seized the riding in 1973 and held it for the next three decades, during which time it was usually fairly safe for the Tories.

In the 1999 election, Ron Lemieux became the first New Democrat to be elected for the constituency. He was re-elected in the 2003 election with almost 60% of the popular vote. The boundary changes of 2008 greatly changed the borders of the riding, which contributed to the decisive victory of PC candidate Dennis Smook in the 2011 election. Ron Lemieux was personally re-elected to the newly created riding of Dawson Trail.

List of provincial representatives

Electoral results

1879 general election

1880 by-election

1882 by-election

1883 general election

1884 by-election

1885 by-election

1886 general election

1888 by-election

1888 general election

1892 general election

1896 general election

1899 general election

1903 general election

1907 general election

1910 general election

1914 general election

1915 general election

1920 general election

1922 general election

1927 general election

1932 general election

1936 general election

1941 general election

1945 general election

1949 general election

1952 by-election

1953 general election

1958 general election

1959 general election

1962 general election

1966 general election

1969 general election

1973 general election

1977 general election

1981 general election

1986 general election

1988 general election

1990 general election

1995 general election

1999 general election

2003 general election

2007 general election

2011 general election

2016 general election

2019 general election

Previous boundaries

References

Manitoba provincial electoral districts